Moraa Gitaa is a Kenyan novelist, born in Mombasa. She is also a Peace Studies and Conflict Resolution researcher, cultural
advocate and arts curator. She is the author of the YA novels Let's Talk About This, The Kigango Oracle, Hila and The Shark Attack.

Career

Gitaa's debut full-length adult fiction novel, Crucible for Silver and Furnace for Gold, centres on two characters: Lavina, a Kenyan African woman living with HIV, and Giorgio, an Italian man whom Lavina meets on vacation in Malindi on Kenya's coast.  Gitaa's sophomore novel is Shifting Sands.

Crucible for Silver and Furnace for Gold has been critiqued by scholars as a re-reading and re-writing of gender in times of HIV. Her work on Shifting Sands received a positive review in the Nairobi Star from Khainga O' Okwemba, who said: "Here is a writer with the patience, perseverance and discipline needed to create vivid characters. Here is a contemporary Kenyan writer capable of bedazzling and cajoling the reader with a skillfully written and scintillating narrative.... Shifting Sands is a must read for literature students."  Gitaa's stories focus on the vulnerable, underserved, marginal and marginalized
members of contemporary African society.

Gitaa's non-fiction and short stories have been featured in Harvard University's Transition Magazine, PEN International's PEN OutWrite,, IFLAC'S Peace & Anti-Terror Anthology, Spotlight Publisher's Waiting and Other Stories, Creatives
Garage Anthology, several Author Me Anthologies, several G21 The World's Magazine Anthologies including Africa Fresh! New Voices from the First Continent, The African Magazine, and Hekaya Initiative

In 2014 James Murua's Literary Blog included Gitaa in a list of 39 top African novelists under the age of 40 writing in English.

Works

 Let's Talk About This. Worlds Unknown Publishers,  Kenya, 2020
 The Kigango Oracle. Worlds Unknown Publishers, Kenya, 2020
 Hila. Storymoja Publishers, Kenya, 2015
 The Shark Attack. Moran Publishers, Kenya, 2014
 The Con Artist. Kenya Literature Bureau, Kenya, 2014
 Shifting Sands. Nsemia Publishers, Kenya, 2012
 Crucible for Silver and Furnace for Gold. Nsemia Publishers, Kenya, 2008

Anthologies featured
African Land Policy Center (ALPC) Anthology ‘Finding Ground and Other Stories’ on land governance in Africa, 2022.  
Hekaya Arts Initiative Issue 01 / Libros Agency: Anthology - Jihadi Bride and Other Stories, Kenya, 2018 
Transition Magazine Issue 121: Theme - Childhood - Hutchins Center for African and African American Research at Harvard University, 2016
Creatives Garage: Femmolution Volume 01, Kenya, 2016
Waiting and Other Stories: Spotlight Publishers, Kenya, 2016
PEN OutWrite - Obscure Oddities: LGBTQI Issue Published by PEN International, 2015
G2's Anthology - Africa Fresh! New Voices from the First Continent, 2010

Awards
2022-2023 IAS-CEU Writer-in-Residence / Fellow: Institute for Advanced Study - Central European University  
2022 Jomo Kenyatta Prize for Literature (JKPL) - Shortlisted with 'Let's Talk About This'  
2021 James Currey Prize for African Literature (Longlist)  
2021 NOMMO Awards (Nominated/Longlist) 
2017 apexart Fellow 
2014 Burt Award 
2010 Penguin Prize for African Writing (Shortlist) 
2008 National Book Development Council of Kenya - Book Week Literary Awards (First Prize Winner Adult Fiction Category)

References

External links 
Author's website
Moraa Gitaa's LinkedIn Profile

Year of birth missing (living people)
Living people
Kenyan novelists
21st-century novelists
Writers from Nairobi
Kenyan women writers
21st-century Kenyan women writers
21st-century Kenyan writers
Kenyan women novelists
Kenyan women curators